Mount Palmer is a mountain located in the Athabasca River Valley of Jasper National Park in Alberta, Canada.

Mt. Palmer lies southeast of Gong Lake. The mountain was named after American Howard Palmer, an early 20th-century explorer of the Selkirks and the Canadian Rockies.

References

Mountains of Jasper National Park
Three-thousanders of Alberta
Winston Churchill Range